Renee Elise Poetschka (born 1 May 1971) is a former Australian athlete. Best known as a relay runner, she won a bronze medal at the World Champion in the 4x400 metres relay and a gold medal in the same event at the World Junior Championships.

Athletic career 

A five-time National Champion in the individual 400 metres, she was twice ranked in the World's Top Ten by Track and Field News in 1995 (9th) and 1996 (10th).

At the 1993 Australian National Championships, Poetschka also won the 400m Hurdles.  Her younger sister, Lauren later became national champion in the hurdles event and represented Australia at the Olympic Games.

Achievements

Personal bests 
 100 metres – 11.62 s (1996)
 200 metres – 23.06 s (1995)
 400 metres – 50.19 s (1994)
 400 metres hurdles – 57.04 s (1993)

Notes

External links 
 Renee Poetschka at Australian Athletics Historical Results
 
 
 
 
 

1971 births
Living people
Australian female hurdlers
Australian female sprinters
Olympic athletes of Australia
Athletes (track and field) at the 1992 Summer Olympics
Athletes (track and field) at the 1996 Summer Olympics
Athletes (track and field) at the 1994 Commonwealth Games
Sportswomen from Western Australia
Athletes from Perth, Western Australia
Commonwealth Games competitors for Australia
World Athletics Championships athletes for Australia
World Athletics Championships medalists
People from Dampier, Western Australia